Harbour Round is a designated place in the Canadian province of Newfoundland and Labrador. It is east of Baie Verte.

History 
The first postmistress in 1961 was Mrs. George Skinner.

Geography 
Harbour Round is in Newfoundland within Subdivision A of Division No. 8.

Demographics 

Attractions 
Harbour Round has fishing and boating activities. It also has a walking trail that leads to a lookout.

Government 
There is no town council in Harbour Round. The only thing provided by the community is garbage collection. There is no form of fire protection. If there is a fire, a call is made to Brent's Cove's Fire Department.

Education 
All students in Harbour Round attend high school and elementary school in La Scie. The nearest medical facility is located in La Scie which is located 10 km from the community.

See also 
List of communities in Newfoundland and Labrador
List of designated places in Newfoundland and Labrador

References 

Designated places in Newfoundland and Labrador
Populated coastal places in Canada